Painted ladies, in the U.S., are Victorian houses repainted in bright polychrome

Painted lady or painted ladies (or capitalised versions) may refer to:

Animals
Any species of the Cynthia group of butterflies in the genus Vanessa, e.g. more specifically:
Painted lady (Vanessa cardui), a butterfly found on most continents except South America
American painted lady (Vanessa virginiensis), a butterfly found throughout North America
Australian painted lady (Vanessa kershawi), a butterfly mostly confined to Australia

Arts and entertainment

Film
The Painted Lady, a 1912 film directed by D. W. Griffith
The Painted Lady (1924 film), an American drama film
Painted Lady (TV series), a 1997 murder mystery drama starring Helen Mirren
Painted Lady, a 2002 documentary short film about Vali Myers
"The Painted Lady" (Avatar: The Last Airbender), an episode from the animated television series Avatar: The Last Airbender

Literature
Painted Ladies (novel), a 2010 Spenser novel by Robert B. Parker

Music
The Painted Ladies, an Australian band that performed at the National Indigenous Music Awards 2015
"Painted Ladies" (song), the debut single by Ian Thomas
"Painted Ladies", a track from the album Henry the Human Fly by Richard Thompson

Plants
Painted lady flowering bean or runner bean (Phaseolus coccineus)
Painted-lady (Echeveria derenbergii), a succulent plant from Mexico
Gladiolus carneus, also known as painted lady Gladiolus

Other
 Painted Lady (mountain), a summit in California

Animal common name disambiguation pages